This is a list of notable events in country music that took place in the year 2007.

Events
 February 11 – It was a big night for country music artists at the 49th Annual Grammy Awards in Los Angeles, as they swept the awards in four top categories. The Dixie Chicks won three of those awards: Record of the Year and Song of the Year (both for "Not Ready to Make Nice," the latter shared with songwriter Dan Wilson) and Album of the Year (Taking the Long Way). Carrie Underwood took the Best New Artist Award.
 Both Underwood and the Dixie Chicks were winners in country-specific categories. The Dixie Chicks won for Best Country Performance By A Duo Or Group With Vocal (for "Not Ready to Make Nice") and Best Country Album ("Taking the Long Way"). Underwood won for Best Female Country  Vocal Performance for "Jesus, Take the Wheel"; the song also earned a Best Country Song award for songwriters Brett James, Hillary Lindsey and Gordie Sampson.
 Also, country music pioneer Bob Wills – the longtime leader of the Texas Playboys – was a posthumous recipient of a Lifetime Achievement Award. Wills was recognized 32 years after his death.
 Week of February 12 – Country music stars team with celebrities during a special celebrity week of Wheel of Fortune, which was taped in Charleston, South Carolina. During the game aired February 13, Julie Roberts and contestant partner Peter Buccellato won $124,250 after Buccallato solved the bonus round puzzle for the show's grand prize of $100,000. Roberts donated a matching amount to St. Jude's Children's Research Hospital.
 February 17 – Hank Williams, Jr. filed for divorce from his fourth wife, Mary Jane, whom he married in 1990.
 March 19 – Days after an announcement that Lonestar had parted ways with longtime record label BNA Records, lead singer Richie McDonald announces plans to depart the group at the end of the year, in search of a solo career.
 March 19 – Professional dancer and country music star-to-be Julianne Hough made her debut on Dancing with the Stars, a televised dance promotion. Teamed with Olympic gold medal-winning speed skater Apolo Anton Ohno, Hough would go on to win the championship for Season 4. Hough would return in the fall to win a second title, this time with two-time Indianapolis 500 champion Hélio Castroneves.
 April 10 – The former home of Johnny Cash and June Carter Cash is destroyed by fire.
 April - Mary Chapin Carpenter is hospitalized for a pulmonary embolism, causing her to cancel all tours for the rest of the year. 
 May 10 – Country music superstar Trisha Yearwood announces she is leaving MCA Records where she had been for 16 years with over 12 million albums sold and 5 number 1 singles. She announced she was signing with Big Machine Records. Yearwood and Big Machine CEO Scott Borchetta met in her intern days at MTM records. Trisha's last top 10 hit with MCA was "I Would've Loved You Anyway" in 2001.
 September 4 – Sammy Kershaw enters the Louisiana lieutenant governor's race, running as a Republican.
 September 15 – Garth Brooks' song, "More Than a Memory" becomes the first song to debut at No. 1 on the Billboard magazine Hot Country Songs chart, since the start of the magazine's all-encompassing country chart in 1958.
 October 21 – Country music legend Porter Wagoner's publicist Darlene Bieber confirms that Wagoner had been diagnosed with lung cancer. Wagoner dies seven days later.
 October 30 – The Eagles release their studio album Long Road Out of Eden, their first compilation of all-new material in 28 years. The album sells over a million copies in its first two weeks.

Top hits of the year
The following songs placed within the Top 20 on the Hot Country Songs or Canada Country charts in 2007:

Top new album releases
The following albums placed within the Top 50 on the Top Country Albums charts in 2007:

Other top albums

Deaths
 January 1 – Del Reeves, 74, best known for his "girl-watching" novelty-type songs (e.g., "Girl on the Billboard"). (emphysema)
 January 6 – Sneaky Pete Kleinow, 72, pedal steel guitarist for the Flying Burrito Brothers. (complications from Alzheimer's disease)
 January 13 – Doyle Holly, 70, member of Buck Owens' Buckaroos; he also had a string of minor hits in the early to mid-1970s. (prostate cancer)
 February 2 – Terry McMillan, 53, veteran Nashville session harmonica player and percussionist. (natural causes)
 March 24 – Henson Cargill, 66, country performer best known for 1968 smash "Skip a Rope." (surgical complications)
 April 17 – Glenn Sutton, 69, songwriter and producer best known for the hit "(I Never Promised You a) Rose Garden"; a chief architect of the countrypolitan sound of the late 1960s/early 1970s. (heart attack)
 July 3 – Boots Randolph, 80, member of Nashville's famed "A-Team" of musicians; he was the saxophonist (subdural hematoma)
 September 26 – Patrick Bourque, 29, bass guitarist for the group Emerson Drive. (suicide)
 October 28 – Porter Wagoner, 80, rhinestone-suited country music icon, television program host of the 1960s and 1970s, duet partner of Dolly Parton. (lung cancer)
 November 6 – Hank Thompson, 82, Western-swing styled artist best known for "The Wild Side of Life", 1960's "A Six Pack to Go", and others. (lung cancer)
 November 18 – John Hughey, 73, steel guitarist known for his "crying steel" style of playing (Heart complications)
 November 29 – Jim Nesbitt, 75, best known for the hits "Please Mr. Kennedy", "A Tiger in My Tank" and "Runnin' Bare". (Extended battle with a heart condition)
 November 30 – Ralph Ezell, 54, bass guitarist and co-founding member of the 1980s and 1990s group Shenandoah. (heart attack)
 December 16 – Dan Fogelberg, 56, Many pop hits with a few minor country hits, including "Same Old Lang Syne" (prostate cancer)

Hall of Fame inductees

Bluegrass Music Hall of Fame inductees
 Howard Watts ("Cedric Rainwater")
 Carl Story

Country Music Hall of Fame inductees
 Ralph Emery (1933-2022),  disc jockey and television host from the 1960s onward.
 Vince Gill (born 1957), singer-songwriter and musician who rose to prominence in the 1980s.
 Mel Tillis (1932–2017), singer and songwriter who rose to fame in the 1950s.

Canadian Country Music Hall of Fame inductees
John Allan Cameron
Sheila Hamilton
Cliff Dumas

Major awards

Grammy Awards
(presented February 10, 2008 in Los Angeles)
Best Female Country Vocal Performance – "Before He Cheats", Carrie Underwood
Best Male Country Vocal Performance – "Stupid Boy", Keith Urban
Best Country Performance by a Duo or Group with Vocal – "How Long", Eagles
Best Country Collaboration with Vocals – "Lost Highway", Willie Nelson and Ray Price
Best Country Instrumental Performance – "Throttleneck", Brad Paisley
Best Country Song – "Before He Cheats", Josh Kear and Chris Tompkins
Best Country Album – These Days, Vince Gill
Best Bluegrass Album – The Bluegrass Diaries, Jim Lauderdale

Juno Awards
(presented April 6, 2008 in Calgary)
Country Recording of the Year – Risk, Paul Brandt

CMT Music Awards
(presented April 16 in Nashville)
Video of the Year – "Before He Cheats", Carrie Underwood
Male Video of the Year – "You Save Me", Kenny Chesney
Female Video of the Year – "Before He Cheats", Carrie Underwood
Group Video of the Year – "What Hurts the Most", Rascal Flatts
Duo Video of the Year – "Want To," Sugarland
Breakthrough Video of the Year – "Tim McGraw", Taylor Swift
Wide Open Country Video of the Year – "Love You," Jack Ingram
Video Director of the Year – "Before He Cheats", Carrie Underwood (Director: Roman White)
Johnny Cash Visionary Award – Kris Kristofferson

Americana Music Honors & Awards 
Album of the Year – Children Running Through (Patty Griffin)
Artist of the Year – Patty Griffin
Duo/Group of the Year – The Avett Brothers
Song of the Year – "Hank Williams' Ghost" (Darrell Scott)
Emerging Artist of the Year – The Avett Brothers
Instrumentalist of the Year – Buddy Miller
Spirit of Americana/Free Speech Award – Mavis Staples
Lifetime Achievement: Trailblazer – Lyle Lovett
Lifetime Achievement: Songwriting – Willie Nelson
Lifetime Achievement: Performance – Joe Ely
Lifetime Achievement: Instrumentalist – Ry Cooder
Lifetime Achievement: Executive – Mary Martin
Lifetime Achievement: Producer/Engineer – Jim Dickinson
Wagonmaster Award – Porter Wagoner

Academy of Country Music
(presented May 18, 2008 in Las Vegas)
Entertainer of the Year – Kenny Chesney
Song of the Year – "Stay", Sugarland
Single of the Year – "Stay", Sugarland
Album of the Year – Crazy Ex-Girlfriend, Miranda Lambert
Top Male Vocalist – Brad Paisley
Top Female Vocalist – Carrie Underwood
Top Vocal Duo – Brooks & Dunn
Top Vocal Group – Rascal Flatts
Top New Male Vocalist – Jack Ingram
Top New Female Vocalist – Taylor Swift
Top New Duo or Group – Lady Antebellum
Video of the Year – "Online", Brad Paisley
Vocal Event of the Year – "Find out Who Your Friends Are", Tracy Lawrence, Tim McGraw and Kenny Chesney
ACM/Home Depot Humanitarian Award – Rascal Flatts
Cliffie Stone Pioneer Award – Brenda Lee, The Oak Ridge Boys, Conway Twitty, Porter Wagoner
Crystal Milestone Award – Garth Brooks
Poets Award – Bill Anderson and Fred Rose

ARIA Awards 
(presented in Sydney on October 28, 2007)
Best Country Album – Love, Pain & the Whole Crazy Thing (Keith Urban)
ARIA Hall of Fame – Frank Ifield

Canadian Country Music Association
(presented September 10 in Regina)
Kraft Cheez Whiz Fans' Choice Award – Terri Clark
Male Artist of the Year – Brad Johner
Female Artist of the Year – Carolyn Dawn Johnson
Group or Duo of the Year – Emerson Drive
SOCAN Song of the Year – "Hold My Beer", Mitch Merrett, Aaron Pritchett, and Deric Ruttan
Single of the Year – "Moments", Emerson Drive
Album of the Year – Doc Walker, Doc Walker
Top Selling Album – Taking the Long Way, Dixie Chicks
CMT Video of the Year – "Moments", Emerson Drive
Chevy Trucks Rising Star Award – Shane Yellowbird
Roots Artist or Group of the Year – Corb Lund

Country Music Association
(presented November 7 in Nashville)
Entertainer of the Year – Kenny Chesney
Song of the Year – "Give It Away", Bill Anderson, Jamey Johnson and Buddy Cannon
Single of the Year – "Before He Cheats", Carrie Underwood
Album of the Year – It Just Comes Natural, George Strait
Male Vocalist of the Year – Brad Paisley
Female Vocalist of the Year – Carrie Underwood
Vocal Duo of the Year – Sugarland
Vocal Group of the Year – Rascal Flatts
Horizon Award – Taylor Swift
Video of the Year – "Online", Brad Paisley (Director: Jason Alexander)
Vocal Event of the Year – "Find Out Who Your Friends Are", Tracy Lawrence with Tim McGraw and Kenny Chesney
Musician of the Year – Jerry Douglas

References

Other links
 Country Music Association
 Inductees of the Country Music Hall of Fame

Country
Country music by year